Marco Giuseppe Peranda (Macerata, c. 1625 – 12 January 1675 in Dresden) was an Italian musician and composer active in Germany.

Life
He was one of the most notable Italian musicians in Germany during the early Baroque alongside Vincenzo Albrici, Carlo Pallavicino and Giovanni Andrea Bontempi in Dresden. These four Italian Kapellmeisters were well rewarded – they earned yearly salaries of 1,200 Reichstalers while Heinrich Schütz, at this point semi-retired, earned 800 Reichstalers a year. A contemporary, Agostino Rossi, records him as being a native of Macerata but his musical style shows an education in Rome. From 1651 Perenda was an alto singer in the chapel of Johann Georg II of Saxony as he combined his own chapel choir with that of his father's. In 1661 Peranda became Vizekapellmeister and in 1663 Kapellmeister, as successor of Albrici. His opera Dafne (composed in collaboration) was performed to open the Opernhaus am Taschenberg in Dresden. In 1670 he made a journey to Italy, from which two masses and a motet remain in the Kroměříž residence. In 1672 he was promoted again, to Hofkapellmeister, possibly since Christoph Bernhard had taken a better offer in Hamburg. In 1675 Peranda died, and since unlike some Italian musicians he had never converted to Lutheranism, was buried in Marienstern Abbey in Dresden.

Works
Only an estimated third of his works survive:
 1668: Markus-Passion (Historia des Leidens und Sterbens unseres Herren Jesu Christi)
 1668: Weihnachtshistorie (lost)
 1671: Dafne (Opera with Giovanni Andrea Bontempi)
 1673: Jupiter und Jo (lost – a collaboration with Bontempi or Constantin Christian Dedekind)
 1675: Il sacrificio di Jefte (i.e. Jephtha, lost, libretto survives)

References

External links
Peranda als Kollege Heinrich Schuetz

Italian Baroque composers
Italian male classical composers
1620s births
1675 deaths
17th-century Italian composers
17th-century male musicians